Granville Central High School (GCHS) is a high school located in Stem, North Carolina and is part of the Granville County Schools system.

Granville Central opened for the 2007–2008 school year for grades 9 and 10. It was opened partially to relieve the overcrowded J. F. Webb High School and South Granville High School. The following school year the junior class was added, and in the 2009–2010 the senior class was added. The first graduating class from GCHS was the class of 2010. Although, the first class to graduate from the full term milestone (all grade progress attended at GCHS) was the 2011 class.

Student Attendance:

 Total Students (estimated)638
 Student Demographics39% Hispanic, 31% Black, 23% White, 5% Two or more Races, 1% Asian, 1% American Indian

 Notable Alumni

Sports
Granville Central offers a variety of sports including wrestling, baseball, basketball, soccer, volleyball, softball, football, cross country, track and field, and tennis.

References

External links
 Granville Central High School

Public high schools in North Carolina
Schools in Granville County, North Carolina